Steven Ray (born 25 March 1990) is a Scottish mixed martial artist who competes in the Lightweight division of the Professional Fighters League (PFL).  A professional competitor since 2010, he has also formerly competed for the Ultimate Fighting Championship (UFC), BAMMA and Cage Warriors, where he was the Lightweight Champion, as well as the BAMMA British Lightweight Champion.

Mixed martial arts career

Early career
Ray started as an amateur, going 7–0, his first fight was a short notice fight, at Middleweight, for which he weighted in 175 lbs. His next fights were at Welterweight.

Ray made his professional mixed martial arts debut in June 2010. Ray competed predominantly in the United Kingdom where he amassed a record of 16–5 before joining the Ultimate Fighting Championship.

He also won a pro muay thai fight against Scott Morrison, class B rules, super middleweight division, by unanimous decision on 12 May 2012.

Brazilian jiu jitsu
Stevie Ray has also competed in Brazilian jiu-jitsu, in 2011 he won the Scotia Cup 2011, in the middleweight (under 82,3 kg/181 lbs) division at white belt and the Glasgow Open 2011, in the medium-heavyweight (under 88,3 kg/194 lbs) division at white belt.

In 2012 he won Scotia Cup 2012, in the medium-heavyweight (under 88,3 kg/194 lbs) division at blue belt and the Glasgow Open 2012, in the middleweight (under 82,3 kg/181 lbs) division at blue belt.

In 2013 he placed 3rd in the Glasgow No Gi Open 2013, in the middleweight (under 82,3 kg/181 lbs) advanced division.

Stevie fought Ellis Younger in a no gi grappling match, at 176 lbs / 80 kg, on the 25th of August 2018, in an event called Scottish Grappling Invitational 2. He lost the match on points.

On April 20, 2019, Ray competed in the Edinburgh Open 2019, he took 1st place in the Middleweight (82,3 kg/181 lbs) Gi - purple belt division and also took 1st place in the Middleweight (79,5 kg/175 lbs) No Gi - purple belt division.

Stevie made his return to the grappling scene at on August 19, 2019 at Polaris 11, taking on former Cage Warriors champion Paddy Pimblett in a - 77 kg nogi bout, winning the match by inside heel hook.

Ultimate Fighting Championship
Ray made his promotional debut as a short notice replacement for an injured Jason Saggo against Marcin Bandel on 11 April 2015 at UFC Fight Night 64. Ray won the one-sided fight via TKO in the second round.

Ray faced Leonardo Mafra on 18 July 2015 at UFC Fight Night 72. He won the fight via TKO in the first round and earned a Performance of the Night bonus.

Ray faced Mickael Lebout on 24 October 2015 at UFC Fight Night 76. He won the bout by unanimous decision.

Ray was expected to face Jake Matthews on 8 July 2016 at The Ultimate Fighter 23 Finale. However, Ray pulled out of the fight in early June due to visa issues and was replaced by Kevin Lee.

Ray next faced Alan Patrick on 24 September 2016 at UFC Fight Night 95. He lost the fight via unanimous decision.

Ray faced Ross Pearson on 19 November 2016 at UFC Fight Night 99. He won the fight via split decision.

Ray next faced Joe Lauzon on 22 April 2017 at UFC Fight Night 108. After taking a beating and coming close to being finished by Lauzon in the first round, Ray came back strong in the second and third rounds when Lauzon started to fade because of the energy he used in the first round. After a close fight, Ray was awarded a majority decision victory.

Ray faced Paul Felder on 16 July 2017 at UFC Fight Night 113. He lost the fight by knockout in the first round after being dropped with a knee strike and subsequently finished off with a series of elbows, marking the first time he's been finished by strikes in his MMA career. The fight with Felder also marked the last fight of his prevailing contract with UFC.

As the first bout of his new four-fight contract, Ray faced Kajan Johnson on 17 March 2018 at UFC Fight Night 127. He lost the fight via split decision.

Ray faced Jessin Ayari on 27 October 2018 at UFC Fight Night 138 He won the fight by controversial unanimous decision.

Ray faced Leonardo Santos on 1 June 2019 at UFC Fight Night: Gustafsson vs. Smith. He lost the fight via knockout in the first round.

Ray faced Michael Johnson at UFC on ESPN+ 20 on 26 October 2019. He won the fight via majority decision.

Ray was expected to face Marc Diakiese on 21 March 2020 at UFC Fight Night: Woodley vs. Edwards. However, Ray was removed from the card in late-January for undisclosed reasons. Diakiese is expected to remain on the card against promotional newcomer Jai Herbert However, due to COVID-19 pandemic, the event was cancelled.

On 21 September 2020 Ray announced his retirement from competing in MMA due to ongoing knee injuries. He would later reveal that his retirement was due to the UFC cutting him from the promotion due to turning down a fight due to visa issues stemming from prior legal problems, something which he claims the UFC was already aware of.

Professional Fighters League 
In 2021, Ray came out of retirement and signed with Professional Fighters League.

Ray faced Alexander Martinez on April 20, 2022 at PFL 1. He lost the bout via unanimous decision.

Ray faced Anthony Pettis on June 24, 2022 at PFL 5. He won the bout in the second round via modified body triangle.

Ray rematched Anthony Pettis in the Semifinals of the Lightweight tournament on August 5, 2022 at PFL 7. Once again, Ray won the bout, this time via unanimous decision.

Ray faced Olivier Aubin-Mercier in the finals of the Lightweight tournament on November 25, 2022 at PFL 10. He lost the bout after being knocked out in the second round.

Championships and accomplishments

Mixed martial arts
Ultimate Fighting Championship
Performance of the Night (One time) vs. Leonardo Mafra
BAMMA
BAMMA British Lightweight Championship
Cage Warriors Fighting Championship
CWFC Lightweight Championship (Two times)
One successful title defence
CWFC 2013 Lightweight Tournament Winner
Total Combat
TC European Welterweight Championship
On Top Promotions
OTP 2011 Welterweight Tournament Runner-up
Scottish Fight Challenge
SFC Welterweight Championship
SFC Welterweight Tournament Winner
Sherdog
2022 Submission of the Year

Brazilian Jiu-Jitsu
Scotia Cup
Scotia Cup 2011 white belt middleweight (under 82,3 kg/181 lbs) – 1st place
Scotia Cup 2012 blue belt medium-heavyweight (under 88,3 kg/194 lbs) – 1st place
Glasgow Open
Glasgow Open 2011 white belt medium-heavyweight (under 88,3 kg/194 lbs) – 1st place
Glasgow Open 2012 blue belt middleweight (under 82,3 kg/181 lbs) – 1st place
Edinburgh Open
Edinburgh Open 2019 purple belt middleweight division (under 82,3 kg/181 lbs) - 1st place

Submission Grappling
Glasgow No Gi Open
Glasgow Open 2013 advanced middleweight division (under 82,3 kg/181 lbs) – 3rd place
Edinburgh Open
Edinburgh Open 2019 middleweight division (under 79,5 kg/175 lbs) - 1st place

Mixed martial arts record

|-
|Loss
|align=center|25–11
|Olivier Aubin-Mercier
|KO (punch)
|PFL 10
|
|align=center|2
|align=center|4:40
|New York City, New York, United States
|
|-
|Win
|align=center|25–10
|Anthony Pettis
|Decision (unanimous)
|PFL 7
|
|align=center|3
|align=center|5:00
|New York City, New York, United States
|
|-
|Win
|align=center|24–10
|Anthony Pettis
|Submission (twister)
|PFL 5
|
|align=center|2
|align=center|3:57
|Atlanta, Georgia, United States
|
|-
|Loss
|align=center|23–10
|Alexander Martinez
|Decision (unanimous)
|PFL 1
|
|align=center|3
|align=center|5:00
|Arlington, Texas, United States
|
|-
|Win
|align=center|23–9
|Michael Johnson
|Decision (majority)
|UFC Fight Night: Maia vs. Askren 
|
|align=center|3
|align=center|5:00
|Kallang, Singapore
|
|-
|Loss
|align=center|22–9
|Leonardo Santos
|KO (punch)
|UFC Fight Night: Gustafsson vs. Smith 
|
|align=center|1
|align=center|2:17
|Stockholm, Sweden
|
|-
|Win
|align=center|22–8
|Jessin Ayari
|Decision (unanimous)
|UFC Fight Night: Volkan vs. Smith 
|
|align=center|3
|align=center|5:00
|Moncton, New Brunswick, Canada
|
|-
|Loss
|align=center|21–8
|Kajan Johnson
|Decision (split)
|UFC Fight Night: Werdum vs. Volkov 
|
|align=center|3
|align=center|5:00
|London, England
|
|-
|Loss
|align=center|21–7
|Paul Felder
|KO (elbows)
|UFC Fight Night: Nelson vs. Ponzinibbio 
|
|align=center|1
|align=center|3:57
|Glasgow, Scotland
|
|-
|Win
|align=center|21–6
|Joe Lauzon
|Decision (majority)
|UFC Fight Night: Swanson vs. Lobov
|
|align=center|3
|align=center|5:00
|Nashville, Tennessee, United States
|
|-
|Win
|align=center|20–6
|Ross Pearson
|Decision (split)
|UFC Fight Night: Mousasi vs. Hall 2
|
|align=center|3
|align=center|5:00
|Belfast, Northern Ireland
| 
|-
|Loss
|align=center|19–6 
|Alan Patrick
| Decision (unanimous)
|UFC Fight Night: Cyborg vs. Lansberg
|
|align=center| 3
|align=center| 5:00
|Brasília, Brazil
|  
|-
|Win
|align=center|19–5
|Mickael Lebout
|Decision (unanimous)
|UFC Fight Night: Holohan vs. Smolka
|
|align=center|3
|align=center|5:00
|Dublin, Ireland
| 
|-
| Win
| align=center| 18–5
| Leonardo Mafra
| TKO (punches)
| UFC Fight Night: Bisping vs. Leites
| 
| align=center| 1
| align=center| 2:30
| Glasgow, Scotland
| 
|-
| Win
| align=center| 17–5
| Marcin Bandel
| TKO (punches)
| UFC Fight Night: Gonzaga vs. Cro Cop 2
| 
| align=center| 2
| align=center| 1:35
| Kraków, Poland
| 
|-
| Win
| align=center| 16–5
| Curt Warburton
| Submission (rear-naked choke)
| Cage Warriors 73
| 
| align=center| 2
| align=center| 2:00
| Newcastle upon Tyne, England
| 
|-
| Win
| align=center| 15–5
| Curt Warburton
| Decision (split)
| Cage Warriors 69: Super Saturday
| 
| align=center| 5
| align=center| 5:00
| London, England
| 
|-
| Loss
| align=center| 14–5
| Ivan Buchinger
| Submission (rear-naked choke)
| Cage Warriors 63
| 
| align=center| 4
| align=center| 3:43
| Dublin, Ireland
| 
|-
| Win
| align=center| 14–4
| Sean Carter
| Submission (rear-naked choke)
| Cage Warriors 60
| 
| align=center| 1
| align=center| 4:40
| London, England
| 
|-
| Win
| align=center| 13–4
| Jason Ball
| Decision (unanimous)
| Cage Warriors 60
| 
| align=center| 2
| align=center| 5:00
| London, England
| 
|-
| Loss
| align=center| 12–4
| Curt Warburton
| Decision (unanimous)
| BAMMA 12
| 
| align=center| 3
| align=center| 5:00
| Newcastle upon Tyne, England
| 
|-
| Win
| align=center| 12–3
| Dale Hardiman
| Decision (unanimous)
| BAMMA 11
| 
| align=center| 3
| align=center| 5:00
| Birmingham, England
| 
|-
| Win
| align=center| 11–3
| Stu Barrs
| TKO (punches)
| Caledonian Combat 1: The Gathering
| 
| align=center| 2
| align=center| 3:37
| Inverness, Scotland
| 
|-
| Win
| align=center| 10–3
| Qasim Shafiq
| Submission (armbar)
| OTP: On Top 5
| 
| align=center| 1
| align=center| 1:02
| Glasgow, Scotland
| 
|-
| Loss
| align=center| 9–3
| Assan Njie
| Submission (guillotine choke)
| Cage Warriors Fight Night 4
| 
| align=center| 2
| align=center| 2:29
| Dubai, United Arab Emirates
| 
|-
| Win
| align=center| 9–2
| Vaidas Valancius
| Submission (rear-naked choke)
| OTP: On Top 4
| 
| align=center| 1
| align=center| 2:41
| Glasgow, Scotland
| 
|-
| Win
| align=center| 8–2
| John Quinn
| KO (punches)
| OTP: On Top 3
| 
| align=center| 1
| align=center| 0:57
| Glasgow, Scotland
| 
|-
| Loss
| align=center| 7–2
| Nico Musoke
| Submission (rear-naked choke)
| OTP: On Top 2
| 
| align=center| 1
| align=center| 4:56
| Glasgow, Scotland
| 
|-
| Win
| align=center| 7–1
| Merv Mulholland
| Submission (triangle armbar)
| OTP: On Top 2
| 
| align=center| 2
| align=center| 4:59
| Glasgow, Scotland
| 
|-
| Win
| align=center| 6–1
| Scott Ward
| TKO (punches)
| Scottish Fight Challenge 4: Resolution
| 
| align=center| 3
| align=center| 0:00
| Stirling, Scotland
| 
|-
| Win
| align=center| 5–1
| Davey Parker
| Submission (arm-triangle choke)
| Total Combat 39
| 
| align=center| 1
| align=center| 2:14
| Durham, England
| 
|-
| Loss
| align=center| 4–1
| Dan Hope
| Technical Submission (armbar)
| Honour 4
| 
| align=center| 1
| align=center| 0:00
| Aberdeen, Scotland
| 
|-
| Win
| align=center| 4–0
| Mark Young
| Submission (heel hook)
| Scottish Fight Challenge 3: Showdown
| 
| align=center| 1
| align=center| 0:00
| Stirling, Scotland
| 
|-
| Win
| align=center| 3–0
| Vincent del Guerra
| Decision (unanimous)
| Scottish Fight Challenge 3: Showdown
| 
| align=center| 2
| align=center| 5:00
| Stirling, Scotland
| 
|-
| Win
| align=center| 2–0
| Loic Marty
| Submission (D'Arce choke)
| Brawl at the Bay
| 
| align=center| 1
| align=center| 0:00
| Fife, Scotland
| 
|-
| Win
| align=center| 1–0
| Shaun Edmondson
| KO (punch)
| Scottish Fight Challenge 2: Retribution
| 
| align=center| 1
| align=center| 1:54
| Stirling, Scotland
|

See also
List of current PFL fighters
List of male mixed martial artists

References

External links

Living people
1990 births
Sportspeople from Kirkcaldy
Lightweight mixed martial artists
Welterweight mixed martial artists
Mixed martial artists utilizing Muay Thai
Mixed martial artists utilizing Brazilian jiu-jitsu
Scottish male mixed martial artists
Scottish male kickboxers
Scottish Muay Thai practitioners
Scottish practitioners of Brazilian jiu-jitsu
Ultimate Fighting Championship male fighters